Cosma Foot is a French Guianese football team playing in the Promotion d'Honneur Poule Ouest, the second league.

History 
The club is based in Saint-Laurent-du-Maroni and played his home matches in the Stade Rene Long. COSMA played long time in the French Guiana Championnat National and was after the 2009/2010 season, relegated to the Promotion d'Honneur.

Notable players 
 Fréderic Adinge (four matches for the French Guiana national football team)
 Janot Apagui (three matches for the French Guiana national football team)
 Hambel Difou (three matches for the French Guiana national football team)
 Jocelyn Koniki (one match for the French Guiana national football team)
 Rudy Merille (ten matches for the French Guiana national football team)

Achievements
Coupe de Guyane

 2004/2005 Final.
 2005/2006 Final.

References

Football clubs in French Guiana